John Gerber (May 18, 1906 – January 28, 1981) was an American bridge player.

Gerber was born in  Yelisavetgrad, Russian Empire (now Kropyvnytskyi, Ukraine). He settled in Houston, Texas, where he died in a hospital at age 74.

Gerber was inducted into the ACBL Hall of Fame in 1998.

Bridge accomplishments

Honors

 ACBL Hall of Fame, 1998

Wins

 North American Bridge Championships (7)
 Wernher Open Pairs (1) 1959 
 Hilliard Mixed Pairs (1) 1958 
 Marcus Cup (1) 1955 
 Mitchell Board-a-Match Teams (1) 1953 
 Chicago Mixed Board-a-Match (1) 1964 
 Reisinger (1) 1964 
 Spingold (1) 1954

Runners-up

 Bermuda Bowl (1) 1961
 North American Bridge Championships
 Rockwell Mixed Pairs (2) 1953, 1968 
 Wernher Open Pairs (1) 1957 
 Nail Life Master Open Pairs (1) 1974 
 Mitchell Board-a-Match Teams (1) 1960 
 Chicago Mixed Board-a-Match (1) 1967 
 Reisinger (2) 1957, 1959 
 Spingold (1) 1967

References

External links
 
 

1906 births
1981 deaths
American contract bridge players
Bermuda Bowl players
People from Houston
American people of Ukrainian-Jewish descent
Emigrants from the Russian Empire to the United States